Thomas Franklin Louderback, Jr.  ( March 5, 1933  - December 8, 2020) was a former American football linebacker in the National Football League for the Philadelphia Eagles.  He also played in the American Football League for the Oakland Raiders and Buffalo Bills.  Louderback played college football at San José State University and was drafted in the tenth round of the 1955 NFL Draft by the Washington Redskins.

Reference

1933 births
2020 deaths
People from Petaluma, California
American football linebackers
Buffalo Bills players
Philadelphia Eagles players
Oakland Raiders players
San Jose State Spartans football players
Sportspeople from the San Francisco Bay Area
Players of American football from California
American Football League players